Plated fabrics are fabrics that have different colors or types of face and back. The fabrics are formed by using different kinds of yarn types or colors to both be invisible on the other side. Different properties of several textile fibers are exploited to obtain various surface interests and patterns. One of the aspects is the thermophysiological and moisture comfort of clothing.

Method 
Plated fabrics are the combination of two separate yarns of different properties. The Knitted plated fabrics are produced by an arrangement of needles that do not allow the back yarn to come on the face (also called right side of the fabric) and vice versa. 

Particular knitting machines allow the selective knitting of the separate yarns on the face and back and form Plated fabrics.

Use 
The fibers with opposite characteristics help in producing functional clothing. Careful selection of the fibers on both sides produces better opportunities and outcomes. Different fibers have different properties, like natural fibers are hygroscopic, and synthetics are hydrophobic. The contrast of the properties is used to obtain different results in forming patterns and functions. For example, fabrics with cotton on top and polyester inside are suitable for moisture wicking. The same is with a plated fabric with cotton and polypropylene.

Advantages
The plated fabric helps in improving clothing comfort through the thermophysiological  and moisture comfort (sensation of dampness).

See also 

 Technical textile

References 

Textiles
Knitted fabrics